Belvedere is a lithograph print by the Dutch artist M. C. Escher, first printed in May 1958. It shows a plausible-looking belvedere building that is an impossible object, modelled after an impossible cube.

Imagery
In this lithograph, Escher uses two-dimensional images to depict objects free of the confines of the three-dimensional world. The image is of a rectangular, three-story building. The upper two floors are open at the sides, with the top floor and roof supported by pillars. From the viewer's perspective, all the pillars on the middle floor are the same size at both the front and back, but the pillars at the back are set higher. The viewer also sees by the corners of the top floor that it is at a different angle than the rest of the structure. All these elements make it possible for all the pillars on the middle floor to stand at right angles, yet the pillars at the front support the back side of the top floor while the pillars at the back support the front side. This paradox also allows a ladder to extend from the inside of the middle floor to the outside of the top floor.

There is a man seated at the foot of the building holding an impossible cube. He appears to be constructing it from a diagram of a Necker cube at his feet, with the intersecting lines circled. The window next to him is closed with an iron grille that is geometrically valid, but practically impossible to assemble.

Influences
The woman about to climb the steps of the building is modeled after a figure from the right-hand panel of Hieronymus Bosch's 1500 triptych The Garden of Earthly Delights. This panel is individually titled Hell; a portion of it was recreated by Escher as a lithograph in 1935.

The ridge in the background is part of the Morrone Mountains in Abruzzo, that Escher had visited several times when living in Italy during the 1920s and 1930s.

Legacy
In 2012, Prof. Gershon Elber of Israel's Technion University, using specially designed CAD software and a 3D printer, created a 3D model of Belvedere and other impossible Escher structures, viewable only from one angle.

References

Sources
 Locher, J. L. (2000). The Magic of M. C. Escher. Harry N. Abrams, Inc. .

1958 prints
Impossible objects
Works by M. C. Escher